Iris Krasnow (born 1954) is an American author, journalism professor, and keynote speaker who specializes in relationships and personal growth. She is the author of Surrendering to Motherhood (1998), the New York Times bestseller Surrendering to Marriage (2002), Surrendering to Yourself (2003), I Am My Mother's Daughter (2007), and The Secret Lives of Wives (2011). Krasnow's sixth book, Sex After...Women Share How Intimacy Changes As Life Changes, was published in February 2014. Krasow's latest book is Camp Girls: Fireside Lessons on Friendship, Courage, and Loyalty. (2020). Krasnow is also the Senior Editor of AARP’s online publication “The Ethel”, for women “who weren’t born yesterday”.

Biography
Krasnow was born and raised in Oak Park, Illinois. After graduating from Stanford University, where she majored in photo-journalism, she became a fashion writer for the Dallas Times Herald. She then moved to United Press International in Washington, D.C., to become the national feature writer. In her several years at UPI, Krasnow specialized in celebrity profiles, including Yoko Ono, Elie Wiesel, Ted Kennedy, Barbara Bush, Norman Mailer, and Queen Noor of Jordan. Krasnow also has an M.A. in Liberal Studies from Georgetown University in Washington, D.C.

Krasnow left her job in daily journalism when she gave birth to twins in 1993, making her the mother of four sons under the age of three. Using this experience, she wrote her first book, Surrendering to Motherhood: Losing Your Mind, Finding Your Soul, which examines the work-family balance for women and takes the stand that motherhood should be viewed as a substantial source of fulfillment and grounding happiness.

Her subsequent books focus on marriage, personal actualization, and mother-daughter relationships: her fifth, The Secret Lives of Wives: Women Share What It Really Takes to Stay Married,  presents strategies for successful long-lasting marriages; and her most recent one published in 2014, Sex After . . .: Women Share How Intimacy Changes as Life Changes takes readers from the college hook-up culture to dating after eighty. Krasnow's books have been translated into eight languages. Her latest book, Camp Girls: Fireside Lessons on Courage, Friendship and Loyalty chronicles her return, at the age of 59, to work at the Wisconsin summer camp of her youth, and how the life skills learned in camp communities form the bones of successful adulthoods.

Krasnow has written for many national publications, including Parade, The Wall Street Journal, The Washington Post, AARP The Magazine, and The Huffington Post. She has been a guest on numerous national television and radio programs, including Oprah, Good Morning America, AARP, The Today Show, and All Things Considered, and she has been featured on CNN several times. For several years she was the relationship correspondent for the Fox Morning News in Baltimore. Interviews with Krasnow, and reviews of her work, have appeared in Time, O: The Oprah Magazine, Glamour, The New Yorker, The New York Times, U.S. News & World Report, and Redbook.
Krasnow is a journalism and women's studies professor at American University in Washington, D.C. She frequently speaks on marriage, childrearing, and "female generational angst" to groups across the United States.

Krasnow lives in Annapolis, Maryland, with her husband, Charles E. Anthony, an architect, whom she married in 1988, and their four sons.

Bibliography

Books

 Surrendering to Motherhood: Losing Your Mind, Finding Your Soul (IBKBooks, 1998)
 Surrendering to Marriage: Husbands, Wives, and Other Imperfections (Miramax, 2001)
 I Am My Mother's Daughter: Making Peace With Mom – Before It's Too Late (Basic Books, 2007)
 The Secret Lives of Wives: Women Share What It Really Takes to Stay Married (Avery, 2012)
 Surrendering to Yourself: You Are Your Own Soul Mate (IBKBooks, 2013)
 Sex After . . .: Women Share How Intimacy Changes as Life Changes (Avery, 2015)
 Camp Girls: Fireside Lessons on Friendship, Courage, and Loyalty (Grand Central Publishing, 2020)

Articles

 "The Fellowship of Women" – The Washington Post, August 8, 1996.
 "The Thin Line Between Marriage and Divorce" – The Huffington Post, July 7, 2016
 "Three Surefire Ways To Make Love Last" – The Huffington Post, February 15, 2017.
 "Forget the 7-Year Itch. The 20-Something One is Far Worse" – The Washington Post, April 17, 2018.
 "Talk to Iris: Love and loss and carrying on" – Capital Gazette, July 14, 2018.
 "Talk to Iris: Cherry trees make our lives seem perfect"  – Capital Gazette, April 5, 2019.
 "I Look at My Hands and See My Mother" – AARP, June 12, 2019.
 "Talk to Iris: Disconnected from technology, we learn big lessons" – Capital Gazette, August 15, 2019.
 "Talk to Iris: On turning 65 and still kicking open new doors" – August 30, 2019.
 "A Camp Girl Forever" – Camping Magazine, March 2020.
 "Why Fading Beauty Requires a Whole New Focus" – The Ethel from AARP. August 18, 2020.

References

External links
 Iris Krasnow - personal website
 'Sex after...' author Iris Krasnow: 'Never TMI for me' - The Washington Post Magazine

American non-fiction writers
1954 births
Stanford University alumni
Georgetown University alumni
American relationships and sexuality writers
Living people
21st-century American women writers
American women non-fiction writers
American women columnists
HuffPost bloggers